The Anthony House was a famous 22 room hotel on the southwest corner of Markham and Scott streets in Little Rock. Construction on the hotel began in 1838. It served as the headquarters for Arkansas governor Elisha Baxter during the Brooks-Baxter War. The hotel was destroyed by fire on September 19, 1875.

References

Further reading

 Kent, Carolyn. (2012). The Anthony House, a Memorable Little Rock Hotel of the 19th Century. Pulaski County Historical Review 60 (Summer 2012): pp. 42–50.
 Kent, Carolyn. (2016). Anthony House. Encyclopedia of Arkansas. 
 Pope, William F., and Dunbar H. Pope. (1895). Early Days in Arkansas: Being for the Most Part the Personal Recollections of an Old Settler. Little Rock, AR: Fredrick W. Allsopp.
 Hampton, Roy F., and Witsell, Charles. (1984). How We Lived: Little Rock as an American City. Little Rock, AR: August House.

1838 establishments in Arkansas
1875 disestablishments in Arkansas
Brooks–Baxter War
Burned hotels in the United States
Fires in Arkansas
Former buildings and structures in Little Rock, Arkansas
History of Little Rock, Arkansas
Hotel buildings completed in 1838
Hotels in Arkansas